Quintus Haterius (c. 63 BCAD 26) was a Roman politician and orator born into a senatorial family.

Career
Haterius was a Populares orator under Augustus, but his style of oration was sometimes criticised. In Seneca's Epistle, "On the Proper Style for a Philosopher’s Discourse," he states that the speech of a philosopher should be able to speak powerfully, yet still keep a steady pace. As an example, he refers to Quintus Haterius who, "…never hesitated, never paused; he made only one start, and one stop." Even the Emperor Augustus commented on his quick delivery, saying that his speech was so rapid that he needed a brake. 
 
In his later life, Haterius was elected Consul Suffectus (the term used to denote the person who served the remainder of the regular consul's term if he died or was removed) in 5 BC. Tacitus mentions Haterius many times in the Annals in senatorial debate.

After the death of Augustus, Tiberius made a show of reluctance to accept power so that he not look ambitious. Asinius Gallus and Haterius both urged Tiberius to set aside his modesty and assume power. Tacitus quotes Haterius: quo usque pateris, Caesar non adesse caput rei publicae? ("How long, Caesar, will you allow the state to be without a head?") Suetonius may have also quoted him, but did not mention his name. Fearing Tiberius' reaction to his urging, Haterius went to the palace to beg forgiveness and threw himself at Tiberius' knees. But his clumsy effort brought the emperor to the ground, and the guards, thinking this was an attack upon Tiberius's person, pounced upon Haterius to kill him. The intervention of Livia saved his life.
 
Haterius was also involved in putting restrictions on the luxury of the country. It was decided by the senate that solid gold vessels should not be used to serve food, and that it was disgraceful for men to wear silken clothes purchased from the East.

As his age advanced, however, Haterius became less well regarded. In a senate meeting discussing how to honour the two sons of Tiberius, Haterius brought forth a motion that all decrees passed that day should be erected in the Senate house in solid gold letters; but his suggestion was laughed at as being foolish.

Quintus Haterius died with the highest honours at the end of AD 26.  Yet an obituary written by Tacitus stated that although he was famous for his oratory skills during his lifetime, that fame had died away and that "while the research and labours of other authors are valued by an after age, the harmonious fluency of Haterius died with him."

Personal life
Haterius was the father of Decimus Haterius Agrippa and the grandfather of Quintus Haterius Antoninus. His wife was likely a daughter of Marcus Vipsanius Agrippa.

See also
 Hateria gens
 List of Roman consuls

References

External links

60s BC births
Year of birth uncertain
26 deaths
Ancient Roman rhetoricians
Suffect consuls of Imperial Rome
Haterii
1st-century BC Romans
1st-century Romans